Bluffton Township is a township in Winneshiek County, Iowa, USA.

History
Bluffton Township was organized in 1856. It was named from its river bluffs.

References

Townships in Winneshiek County, Iowa
Townships in Iowa